Heliothela paracentra is a moth of the family Crambidae. It was described by Edward Meyrick in 1887. It is found in Australia, where it has been recorded from Western Australia.

References

Moths described in 1887
Heliothelini